Information warfare (IW) (as different from cyber warfare that attacks computers, software, and command control systems) is a concept involving the battlespace use and management of information and communication technology (ICT) in pursuit of a competitive advantage over an opponent. Information warfare is the manipulation of information trusted by a target without the target's awareness so that the target will make decisions against their interest but in the interest of the one conducting information warfare. As a result, it is not clear when information warfare begins, ends, and how strong or destructive it is. Information warfare may involve the collection of tactical information, assurance(s) that one's information is valid, spreading of propaganda or disinformation to demoralize or manipulate the enemy and the public, undermining the quality of the opposing force's information and denial of information-collection opportunities to opposing forces. Information warfare is closely linked to psychological warfare.

The United States military focus tends to favor technology and hence tends to extend into the realms of electronic warfare, cyberwarfare, information assurance and computer network operations, attack, and defense.

Most of the rest of the world use the much broader term of "Information Operations" which, although making use of technology, focuses on the more human-related aspects of information use, including (amongst many others) social network analysis, decision analysis, and the human aspects of command and control.

Overview
Information war has been described as "the use of information to achieve our national objectives." According to NATO, "Information war is an operation conducted in order to gain an information advantage over the opponent."

Information warfare can take many forms:
 Television, internet and radio transmission(s) can be jammed.
 Television, internet and radio transmission(s) can be hijacked for a disinformation campaign.
 Logistics networks can be disabled.
 Enemy communications networks can be disabled or spoofed, especially online social community in modern days.
 Stock exchange transactions can be sabotaged, either with electronic intervention, by leaking sensitive information or by placing disinformation.
 The use of drones and other surveillance robots or webcams.
 Communication management
 Synthetic media 
 The organised use of social media and other online content generation platforms can be used for opinion engineering among masses. 

The U.S. Air Force has had Information Warfare Squadrons since the 1980s. In fact, the official mission of the U.S. Air Force is now "To fly, fight and win...in air, space and cyberspace", with the latter referring to its information warfare role.

As the U.S. Air Force often risks aircraft and aircrews to attack strategic enemy communications targets, remotely disabling such targets using software and other means can provide a safer alternative. In addition, disabling such networks electronically (instead of explosively) also allows them to be quickly re-enabled after the enemy territory is occupied. Similarly, counter-information warfare units are employed to deny such capability to the enemy. The first application of these techniques was used against Iraqi communications networks in the Gulf War.

Also during the Gulf War, Dutch hackers allegedly stole information about U.S. troop movements from U.S. Defense Department computers and tried to sell it to the Iraqis, who thought it was a hoax and turned it down. In January 1999, U.S. Air Intelligence computers were hit by a coordinated attack (Moonlight Maze), part of which came from a Russian mainframe.  This could not be confirmed as a Russian cyber attack due to non-attribution – the principle that online identity may not serve as proof of real world identity.

New battlefield
The innovation of more advanced and autonomous ICTs has engendered a new revolution in military affairs, which encompasses nations' use of ICTs in both cyberspace and the physical battlefield to wage war against their adversaries. The three most prevalent revolutions in military affairs come in the form of cyberattacks, autonomous robots and communication management.

Within the realm of cyberspace, there are two primary weapons: network-centric warfare and C4ISR, which denotes integrated Command, Control, Communications, Computers, Intelligence, Surveillance and Reconnaissance. Furthermore, cyberspace attacks initiated by one nation against another nation have an underlying goal of gaining information superiority over the attacked party, which includes disrupting or denying the victimized party's ability to gather and distribute information. A real-world occurrence that illustrated the dangerous potential of cyberattacks transpired in 2007, when a strike from Israeli forces demolished an alleged nuclear reactor in Syria that was being constructed via a collaborative effort between Syria and North Korea. Accompanied with the strike was a cyberattack on Syria's air defenses, which left them blind to the attack on the nuclear reactor and, ultimately allowed for the attack to occur (New York Times 2014). An example of a more basic attack on a nation within cyberspace is a distributed denial of service (DDOS) attack, which is utilized to hinder networks or websites until they lose their primary functionality. As implied, cyberattacks do not just affect the military party being attacked, but rather the whole population of the victimized nation. Since more aspects of daily life are being integrated into networks in cyberspace, civilian populations can potentially be negatively affected during wartime. For example, if a nation chose to attack another nation's power grid servers in a specific area to disrupt communications, civilians and businesses in that area would also have to deal with power outages, which could potentially lead to economic disruptions as well.

Moreover, physical ICTs have also been implemented into the latest revolution in military affairs by deploying new, more autonomous robots (i.e. – unmanned drones) into the battlefield to carry out duties such as patrolling borders and attacking ground targets. Humans from remote locations pilot many of the unmanned drones, however, some of the more advanced robots, such as the Northrop Grumman X-47B, are capable of autonomous decisions.  Despite piloting the drones from remote locations, a proportion of drone pilots still suffer from stress factors of more traditional warfare. According to NPR, a study performed by the Pentagon in 2011 found that 29% of drone pilots are “burned out” and undergo high levels of stress. Furthermore, approximately 17% of the drone pilots surveyed as the study were labeled "clinically distressed" with some of those pilots also showing signs of post-traumatic stress disorder.

Modern ICTs have also brought advancements to communications management among military forces. Communication is a vital aspect of war for any involved party and, through the implementation of new ICTs such as data-enabled devices, military forces are now able to disseminate information faster than ever before. For example, some militaries are now employing the use of iPhones to upload data and information gathered by drones in the same area.

Notable examples

Russo-Ukrainian War

In 2022 Ukrainian forces have taken advantage of deficiencies in Russian communications by allowing them to piggyback on Ukrainian networks, connect, and communicate. Ukrainian forces then eavesdrop, and cut off Russian communications at a crucial part of the conversation.

In an effort to build support prior to its invasion of Ukraine, Russia  perpetuated a narrative that claimed the Ukrainian government was committing violence against its own Russian speaking population. By publishing large amounts of disinformation on the internet, the alternate narrative was picked up in search results, such as Google News.

Russian interference in foreign elections 
Russian interference in foreign elections, most notably the Russian interference in the 2016 United States elections, has been described as information warfare.

Legal and ethical concerns

While information warfare has yielded many advances in the types of attack that a government can make, it has also raised concerns about the moral and legal ambiguities surrounding this particularly new form of war.  Traditionally, wars have been analyzed by moral scholars according to just war theory.  However, with Information Warfare, Just War Theory fails because the theory is based on the traditional conception of war.  Information Warfare has three main issues surrounding it compared to traditional warfare:

The risk for the party or nation initiating the cyberattack is substantially lower than the risk for a party or nation initiating a traditional attack.  This makes it easier for governments, as well as potential terrorist or criminal organizations, to make these attacks more frequently than they could with traditional war.
Information communication technologies (ICT) are so immersed in the modern world that a very wide range of technologies are at risk of a cyberattack.  Specifically, civilian technologies can be targeted for cyberattacks and attacks can even potentially be launched through civilian computers or websites.  As such, it is harder to enforce control of civilian infrastructures than a physical space. Attempting to do so would also raise many ethical concerns about the right to privacy, making defending against such attacks even tougher.
The mass-integration of ICT into our system of war makes it much harder to assess accountability for situations that may arise when using robotic and/or cyber attacks.  For robotic weapons and automated systems, it's becoming increasingly hard to determine who is responsible for any particular event that happens.  This issue is exacerbated in the case of cyberattacks, as sometimes it is virtually impossible to trace who initiated the attack in the first place.

Recently, legal concerns have arisen centered on these issues, specifically the issue of the right to privacy in the United States of America.  Lt. General Keith B. Alexander, who served as the head of Cyber Command under President Barack Obama, noted that there was a "mismatch between our technical capabilities to conduct operations and the governing laws and policies" when writing to the Senate Armed Services Committee.  A key point of concern was the targeting of civilian institutions for cyberattacks, to which the general promised to try to maintain a mindset similar to that of traditional war, in which they will seek to limit the impact on civilians.

See also

 Active measures
 Black propaganda
 Character assassination
 Cyberwarfare
 Communications security
 Command and control warfare
 Disinformation
 Electronic warfare
 Historical revisionism
 Fake news
 Fifth Dimension Operations
 Gatekeeper (politics)
 Industrial espionage
 Information operations
 Internet manipulation
 Irregular warfare
 iWar
 Kompromat
 List of cyber warfare forces
 Network-centric warfare
 New generation warfare
 Political warfare
 Psychological warfare
 Public affairs (military)
 Public relations
 Storm botnet
 Transparency

Group specific:

 Chinese information operations and information warfare
 Cyberwarfare in Russia
 Taliban propaganda
 White Paper on El Salvador

US specific:

 Active Measures Working Group
 CIA
 COINTELPRO
 Edward Bernays
 Enemy Image, a documentary about the Pentagon's approach to news coverage of war
 Information Operations Roadmap
 Information Operations (United States)
 Pentagon military analyst program
 Special Activities Division
 Titan Rain

Notes

References

Bibliography

Books
 Jerome Clayton Glenn, "Future Mind" Chapter 9. Defense p.195-201. Acropolis Books LTD, Washington, DC (1989)
 Winn Schwartau, "Information Warfare: Chaos on the Electronic Superhighway" Thunder's Mouth Press (1993)
 Winn Schwartau, ed, Information Warfare: Cyberterrorism: Protecting your personal security in the electronic age, Thunder's Mouth Press, 2nd ed, (1996).
 John Arquilla and David Ronfeldt, In Athena's Camp, RAND (1997).
 Dorothy Denning, Information Warfare and Security, Addison-Wesley (1998).
 James Adams, The Next World War: Computers are the Weapons and the Front line is Everywhere, Simon and Schuster (1998).
 Edward Waltz, Information Warfare Principles and Operations, Artech House, 1998, 
 John Arquilla and David Ronfeldt, Networks and Netwars: The Future of Terror, Crime, and Militancy, RAND (2001).
 Ishmael Jones, The Human Factor: Inside the CIA's Dysfunctional Intelligence Culture, Encounter Books, New York (2010). Information/intelligence warfare.
 Gregory J. Rattray, Strategic Warfare in Cyberspace, MIT Press (2001).
 Anthony H. Cordesman, Cyber-threats, Information Warfare, and Critical Infrastructure Protection: DEFENDING THE US HOMELAND (2002).
 Leigh Armistead, Information Operations: The Hard Reality of Soft Power, Joint Forces Staff College and the National Security Agency (2004).
 Thomas Rid, War and Media Operations: The US Military and the Press from Vietnam to Iraq, Routledge (2007).

Other
 Science at War: Information Warfare, The History Channel (1998).

External links

Resources
 Politically Motivated Computer Crime
 Cyberspace and Information Operations Study Center , Air University, U.S. Air Force.
 IWS - The Information Warfare Site
 Information Warfare Monitor - Tracking Cyberpower (University of Toronto, Canada/Munk Centre)
 Twitter: InfowarMonitor
 Information Warfare, I-War, IW, C4I, Cyberwar
 Federation of American Scientists - IW Resources 
 Association of Old Crows  http://www.crows.org The Electronic Warfare and Information Operations Association.
 C4I.org - Computer Security & Intelligence
 Information Warfare, Information Operations and Electronic Attack Capabilities Air Power Australia.
 Committee on Policy Consequences and Legal/Ethical Implications of Offensive Information Warfare , The National Academies.
 Program on Information and Warfare, Global Information Society Project, World Policy Institute.
 Information Warriors  Information Warriors is web forum dedicated to the discussion of Navy Information Warfare.
 Mastermind Corporation Information Warfare Tactics Analysis
 Information Warfare in Biology Nature's Exploitation of Information to Win Survival Contests, Monash University, Computer Science.

Course syllabi
 COSC 511 Information Warfare: Terrorism, Crime, and National Security @ Department of Computer Science, Georgetown University (1997–2002) (Dorothy Denning).
 CSE468 Information Conflict (Honours) @ School of Computer Science and Software Engineering, Monash University (2006) (Carlo Kopp).
 Information Warfare, Cyberterrorism, and Hacktivism from Cybercrime, Cyberterrorism and Digital Law Enforcement, New York Law School.

Papers: research and theory
 Col Andrew Borden, USAF (Ret.),  What is Information Warfare? Aerospace Power Chronicles (1999).
 Dr Carlo Kopp, A Fundamental Paradigm of Infowar (February 2000).
 Research & Theory Links , Cyberspace and Information Operations Study Center, Air War College, Air University, U.S. Air Force.
 Lachlan Brumley et al., Cutting Through the Tangled Web: An Information-Theoretic Perspective on Information Warfare (October 2012).
 
 
 Michael MacDonald (2012) "Black Logos: Rhetoric and Information Warfare", pages 189–220 in Literature, Rhetoric and Values: Selected Proceedings of a Conference held at University of Waterloo, 3–5 June 2011, editors Shelley Hulan, Murray McArthur and Randy Allen Harris, Cambridge Scholars Publishing  .
 Taddeo, Mariarosaria (2012). Information Warfare: A Philosophical Perspective. Philosophy and Technology 25 (1):105-120.

Papers: Other
  An essay on Information Operations by Zachary P. Hubbard

News articles
 Army, Air Force seek to go on offensive in cyber war, GovExec.com (June 13, 2007).
 NATO says urgent need to tackle cyber attack, Reuters (June 14, 2007).
 America prepares for 'cyber war' with China, Telegraph.uk.co (June 15, 2007).
 NATO, US gear up for cyberpunk warfare, The Register (June 15, 2007).

United States Department of Defense IO Doctrine
 Information Operations Roadmap (DOD 2003)
 Information Operations (JP 3-13 2006)
 Operations Security (JP 3-13.3)
 Military Deception (JP 3-13.4)
 Joint Doctrine for PSYOP (JP 3-53 2003)
 Joint Doctrine for Public Affairs (JP 3-61 2005)
 Destabilizing Terrorist Networks: Disrupting and Manipulating Information Flows in the Global War on Terrorism, Yale Information Society Project Conference Paper (2005).
 Seeking Symmetry in Fourth Generation Warfare: Information Operations in the War of Ideas, Presentation (PDF slides) to the Bantle - Institute for National Security and Counterterrorism (INSCT) Symposium, Syracuse University (2006).
 K. A. Taipale, Seeking Symmetry on the Information Front: Confronting Global Jihad on the Internet, 16 National Strategy F. Rev. 14 (Summer 2007).

 
Propaganda in the United States
Propaganda techniques using information
Psychological warfare techniques
Warfare post-1945
Disinformation